Rothwell Marlor (second ¼ 1893 – second ¼ 1954), also known by the nickname of "Rod", was an English professional rugby league footballer who played in the 1910s and 1920s.

Background
Rothwell Marlor's birth was registered in Oldham, Lancashire, and his death aged 60–61 was registered in Oldham, Lancashire, England.

Playing career

International honours
Rothwell Marlor won caps for England while at Oldham in 1921 against Wales, and Other Nationalities.

Championship final appearances
Rothwell Marlor played left-, i.e. number 11, in Oldham's 2-13 defeat by Wigan in the Championship Final during the 1921–22 season at The Cliff, Broughton on Saturday 6 May 1922.

County Leagues appearances
Rothwell Marlor played in  Oldham's victory in the Lancashire County League during the 1921–22 season.

Challenge Cup Final appearances
About Rothwell Marlor's time, there was Oldham's 16-3 victory over Hull Kingston Rovers in the 1925 Challenge Cup Final during the 1924–25 season at Headingley Rugby Stadium, the 3-9 defeat by Swinton in the 1926 Challenge Cup Final during the 1925–26 season at Athletic Grounds, Rochdale, and the 26-7 victory over Swinton in the 1927 Challenge Cup Final during the 1926–27 season at Central Park, Wigan.

County Cup Final appearances
About Rothwell Marlor's time, there was Oldham's 5-7 defeat by Warrington in the 1921 Lancashire County Cup Final during the 1921–22 season at The Cliff, Broughton, Salford on Saturday 3 December 1921, and played left-, i.e. number 11, in the 10-0 victory over St Helens Recs in the 1924 Lancashire County Cup Final during the 1924–25 season at The Willows, Salford on Saturday 22 November 1924.

Genealogical information
Rothwell Marlor's marriage to Caroline (née Vesty) (birth registered second ¼ 1893 in Salford district) was registered during first ¼ 1916 in Ashton-under-Lyne district. They had a son, also named Rothwell Marlor (birth registered third ¼ 1916 in Oldham district). Rothwell Marlor's son married Annie and they had a son named John and a daughter named Joyce. John married Carole Murray and they had a daughter named Joanne, a son named David, and two twins named Deborah and Elizabeth.

References

External links
Statistics at orl-heritagetrust.org.uk

1893 births
1954 deaths
England national rugby league team players
English rugby league players
Oldham R.L.F.C. players
Rugby league players from Oldham
Place of death missing
Rugby league props
Rugby league second-rows